Jejen Zainal Abidin (born 17 December 1987) is an Indonesian professional footballer who plays as a wide midfielder.

Club career

Gresik United
In December 2014, Abidin signed with Gresik United.

Hizbul Wathan FC
In 2021, Jejen signed a contract with Indonesian Liga 2 club Hizbul Wathan. He made his league debut on 27 September against Persijap Jepara at the Manahan Stadium, Surakarta.

References

External links 
 
 Jejen Zainal Abidin at Liga Indonesia

1987 births
Living people
Indonesian footballers
Sportspeople from Bandung
Sundanese people
Persikabo Bogor players
Persib Bandung players
Pelita Bandung Raya players
Persiba Bantul players
Gresik United players
Liga 1 (Indonesia) players
Indonesian Premier Division players
Association football midfielders